Callipeltis is a genus of flowering plants in the family Rubiaceae. It was originally described in 1829. The genus is found in Spain, North Africa, the Middle East, the Arabian Peninsula, and Central Asia as far east as Pakistan and Kazakhstan.

Species

 Callipeltis cucullaris (L.) DC. - Spain, Morocco, Algeria, Egypt, Palestine, Turkey, Syria, Lebanon, Iran, Iraq, Israel, Kazakhstan, Turkmenistan, Kyrgyzstan, Uzbekistan, Tajikistan, Armenia, Azerbaijan, Georgia, Oman, Saudi Arabia, Pakistan and the sheikdoms of the Persian Gulf.
 Callipeltis factorovskyi (Eig) Ehrend. - Iraq, Syria, Lebanon, Palestine
 Callipeltis microstegia Boiss. - Iran, Iraq

References

External links
Callipeltis in the World Checklist of Rubiaceae

Rubiaceae genera
Rubieae
Flora of Spain
Flora of Algeria
Flora of Morocco
Flora of Egypt
Flora of Turkey
Flora of Iran
Flora of Iraq
Flora of Central Asia
Flora of Saudi Arabia
Flora of Pakistan
Flora of Oman
Flora of Palestine (region)
Flora of Kazakhstan
Flora of Kyrgyzstan
Flora of Uzbekistan
Flora of Turkmenistan